Marc Venard (11 July 1929 – 11 November 2014) was a French historian.

A student at the École Normale Supérieure, he was agrégé and doctor in history and a specialist of religious history of the 16th century. He was emeritus professor of modern history at the Universities of Rouen and Paris West University Nanterre La Défense and member of the Académie des sciences, belles-lettres et arts de Rouen.

Publications 
1957: Bourgeois et paysans au XVIIe siècle. Recherche sur le rôle des bourgeois parisiens dans la vie agricole au sud de Paris au XVIIe siècle, Paris, SEVPEN
1967: Le Monde et son histoire, tomes V et VI, Paris, Bordas-Laffont
1977–1985: Répertoire des Visites pastorales de la France. Première série : anciens diocèses (jusqu’en 1790), Paris, éd. du CNRS, 4 vol. (in collaboration with D. Julia). Corrections and Compléments, Paris, SHRF, 2006
1993: Réforme protestante, Réforme catholique dans la province d’Avignon, XVIe, Paris, Éditions du Cerf
1998: La religion dans la France moderne (with Anne Bonzon), Paris, Hachette
Direction et rédaction partielle de l’Histoire du Christianisme, Paris, Desclée :
1994: volume 7, De la réforme à la Réformation (1450–1530)
1992: volume 8, Le temps des Confessions  (1530–1620/40)
1997: volume 9, L’Âge de raison (1620/40–1750), 
2000: Le Catholicisme à l’épreuve dans la France du XVIe, Paris, éd. du Cerf (collection of articles)  (prix Gossier of the Académie des sciences, belles-lettres et arts de Rouen)
2010: Les Confréries dans la ville de Rouen à l’époque moderne, XVIe-XVIIIe siècles, Rouen, Société de l’histoire de Normandie,
 Contributions to the Dictionnaire d’histoire et de géographie ecclésiastiques (article "France, XVIe" and some others) ;  to the Histoire générale de l’enseignement et de l’éducation en France, Paris, Nouvelle Librairie de France, volume 2, 1981 ; reprint 2003 ; and to the Histoire de la France religieuse, Paris, éd. du Seuil, volume 2, 1988 ; to The Oxford Encyclopedia of the Reformation, New York et Oxford, 1996 (art. "Assembly of Clergy" and "France")
 Au miroir de Clio-28.09.2014, with Marc Venard (une histoire de la Réforme catholique) : https://www.youtube.com/watch?v=NJMYH7yavkQ

External links 
 Obituary on Le Monde
 Marc Venard (1929-2014) 
 Notice on the site of the Sorbonne
 List of publications on Cairn

1929 births
People from Versailles
2014 deaths
École Normale Supérieure alumni
20th-century French historians